Falconhead Airport  is a public use airport located two nautical miles (2.3 mi, 3.7 km) northwest of the central business district of Burneyville, in Love County, Oklahoma, United States. It is privately owned by Falconhead Airport and Aviation Services, LLC.

The airport is located adjacent to the Falconhead Resort & Country Club.

Facilities and aircraft 
It has one runway designated 18/36 with an asphalt surface measuring 4,400 by 75 feet (1,341 x 23 m).

For the 12-month period ending January 6, 2010, the airport had 460 aircraft operations, an average of 38 per month: 98% general aviation and 2% military. At that time there were 6 aircraft based at this airport: 83% single-engine and 17% multi-engine.

References

External links 
 Falconhead Airport and Aviation Services
 Falconhead (37K)  at Oklahoma Aeronautics Commission website
 Aerial photo as of 19 January 1995 from USGS The National Map
 

Airports in Oklahoma
Buildings and structures in Love County, Oklahoma